The Real Bros of Simi Valley is an American scripted television series based in Simi Valley, California. The satirical comedy both pays homage to and lampoons the culture of Southern California, and several stereotypes and tropes of unscripted reality shows, with hyperbolic emphasis on exaggerated dramatic elements, and canned infighting among the show's cast. 

Jimmy Tatro and Christian A. Pierce co-created and executive produce the series and have written every episode. After directing season one with Michael J. Gallagher, Tatro directed every episode of seasons two and three. Tatro also stars alongside Nick Colletti, Tanner Petulla, and Cody Ko as the titular "Bros", with supporting cast members including Colleen Donovan, Peter Gilroy, Monette Moio, Monica Joy Shere, and Maddy Whitby. The series follows the lives of four friends ten years after their high school graduation.

The first season was released on YouTube and included four episodes. The second season was released November 30, 2018 on Facebook Watch. The third season was released on February 14, 2020. Other executive producers include Mike Rosenstein and Studio 71’s Dan Weinstein, Michael Schreiber, Adam Boorstin and Anjuli Hinds. The show is a parody of Jersey Shore and The Real Housewives. The series received a nomination at the 10th Shorty Awards for best web series.

Episodes

Series overview

Season 1 (2017)

Season 2 (2018–19)

Season 3 (2020)

Cast and characters

Main
 Jimmy Tatro as Xander Sanders
 Nick Colletti as Duncan Surf
 Cody Ko as Wade Sanders
 Tanner Petulla as Bryce Meyer
 Colleen Donovan as Molly McShay
 Peter Gilroy as Johnny Mendez
 Monette Moio as Tessa
 Monica Joy Sherer as Lexy
 Maddy Whitby as Dani (seasons 2–3)

Recurring
 Paul Thomas Arnold as Jeff Sanders
 Eric Walbridge as Brayson (seasons 1–2)
 Tennile Marie Goosic as Sam (season 1)
 Cara Santana as Andrea (season 2)
 Christine Cattell as Sandy Sanders (seasons 2–3)
 Christian A. Pierce as Aldis (seasons 2–3)
 Emmett and Wyatt Phillips as Hawk Sanders (season 2)
 Christopher McDonald as Cal Surf (seasons 2–3)
 Roman Galardi as Ethan (season 2)
 Lauren Elizabeth as Evonne (season 2)
 Pierson Fodé as Yonder (seasons 2–3)
 Oscar Miranda as Hector (season 2)
 Ego Nwodim as Brenda (season 2)
 Brandon Wardell as Brian (season 2)
 Kyle Herbert as Chris (season 2)
 Siddharth Dhananjay as Brinkman (season 2)
 Alice Lee as Chelsie (season 3)
 Hilty Bowen as Jenna (season 3)
 Brock O'Hurn as Keto (season 3)
 Victoria Justice as Courtney Ingles (season 3)
 Thomas Barbusca as a high schooler (season 3)
 Griffin Gluck as Aaron (season 3)

Guests
 Skyler Gisondo as Tyler (season 2)
 Nyjah Huston as himself (season 2)
 Natasha Leggero as Cheryl (season 2)
 Paul Scheer as Dr. Pissing (seasons 2–3)
 Tom Allen as Chad Kroeger (seasons 2–3)
 JT Parr as JT (season 3)
 Romanski as a Dunc Surf customer (season 3)
 Sean O'Bryan as Mark (season 3)
 Blue Kimble as Kane (season 3)
 Brock O'Hurn as Keto (season 3)
 Noel Miller as Mike Schaffer (season 3)
 Jay Chandrasekhar as Dr. Feel (season 3)
 Anwar Jibawi as a truck driver (season 3)
 King Bach as himself (season 3)
 Pete Davidson as Grady (season 3)

References

External links
 
 Los Angeles Times: The surprising wisdom of ‘The Real Bros of Simi Valley’

Facebook Watch original programming
YouTube original programming
Culture of Simi Valley, California
English-language television shows
Television shows set in Ventura County, California
American comedy web series
2018 web series debuts